The 1840 United States presidential election in Illinois took place between October 30 and December 2, 1840, as part of the 1840 United States presidential election. Voters chose five representatives, or electors to the Electoral College, who voted for President and Vice President.

Illinois voted for the Democratic candidate, Martin Van Buren, over Whig candidate William Henry Harrison. Van Buren won Illinois by a margin of 2.01%.

Results

See also
 United States presidential elections in Illinois

References

Illinois
1840
1840 Illinois elections